MC3 connectors are a mostly obsolete type of single contact connector commonly used for connecting solar panels. MC3 are named for the original manufacturer Multi-Contact (now part of Stäubli Electrical Connectors) with a 3 mm² contact assembly pin. They are typically rated at 20 A and 600 V maximum (UL), although the rating of the connector and cable as a whole may vary.

Physical properties
The MC3 connectors incorporate a flexible watertight seal and are supplied as 'male' and 'female' types to minimise the chance of wrong connections. For proper application usage, they are connected with UV resistant, correct diameter cable. The connector pairs hold together by friction and suction, only.

Obsolescence
MC3 connectors have been largely superseded by MC4 connectors due to support being withdrawn by the National Electrical Code for solar applications. The MC3 connector does not incorporate a positive locking mechanism and can become disconnected while the solar panels are producing electricity causing dangerous arcing.

References

Solar panel connectors